John Leslie Carwile is an American diplomat who served as the United States ambassador to Latvia from 2019 to 2023.

Early life and education 

Carwile earned a Bachelor of Arts from the College of Wooster and a Master of Arts from the Paul H. Nitze School of Advanced International Studies.

Career 

Early in his career, Carwile worked to advance the Northern Ireland peace process at the U.S. Consulate General in Belfast. He has twice served as Deputy Chief of Mission, first at the United States Embassy in Brunei and more recently at the United States Embassy in Nepal.  He has also served as Minister-Counselor for Economic Affairs at the United States Embassy in Italy, as well as Counselor for Economic Affairs at both the United States Embassy in Iraq and the United States Embassy in Canada. Prior to his ambassadorship,  he served as Deputy Director of the Office of Career Development and Assignments in the State Department. During his foreign service career he also was assigned as a Consular Officer at the United States Embassy in Peru.

On May 8, 2019, President Trump announced his intent to nominate Carwile to be the next United States Ambassador to Latvia. On September 26, 2019, his nomination was confirmed in the Senate by voice vote. He presented his credentials to President Egils Levits on November 5, 2019.

Personal 
Carwile speaks Italian and Spanish.

See also
List of ambassadors of the United States

References

Living people
Date of birth missing (living people)
Year of birth missing (living people)
Place of birth missing (living people)
21st-century American diplomats
Ambassadors of the United States to Latvia
College of Wooster alumni
Paul H. Nitze School of Advanced International Studies alumni
United States Department of State officials
United States Foreign Service personnel